Events from the year 1964 in the United States.

Incumbents

Federal Government 
 President: Lyndon B. Johnson (D–Texas)
 Vice President: vacant
 Chief Justice: Earl Warren (California)
 Speaker of the House of Representatives: John William McCormack (D–Massachusetts)
 Senate Majority Leader: Mike Mansfield (D–Montana)
 Congress: 88th

Events

January
 January 3 – Senator Barry Goldwater of Arizona announces that he will seek the Republican nomination for president.
 January 7 – A British firm, the Leyland Motor Corp., announces the sale of 450 buses to the Cuban government, challenging the United States blockade of Cuba.
 January 8 – In his first State of the Union Address, U.S. President Lyndon Johnson declares a "War on Poverty".
 January 9 – Martyrs' Day: Armed clashes between United States troops and Panamanian civilians in the Panama Canal Zone precipitate a major international crisis, resulting in the deaths of 21 Panamanians and 4 U.S. soldiers.
 January 10 – Introducing...the Beatles is released by Chicago's Vee-Jay Records to get the jump on Capitol Records' release of Meet the Beatles!, scheduled for January 20. The two record companies fight in court over Vee-Jay's release of the album.
 January 11 – United States Surgeon General Luther Leonidas Terry reports that smoking may be hazardous to one's health, the first such statement from the U.S. government.
 January 12
 The predominantly Arab government of Zanzibar is overthrown by African nationalist rebels; a United States Navy destroyer evacuates 61 U.S. citizens.
 Routine U.S. naval patrols of the South China Sea begin.
 January 13 – In Manchester, New Hampshire, 14-year-old Pamela Mason is murdered. Edward Coolidge is tried and convicted of the crime, but the conviction is set aside by the landmark Fourth Amendment case Coolidge v. New Hampshire (1971).
 January 15
 The nightclub Whisky a Go Go opens its doors on Sunset Strip in Hollywood. Johnny Rivers leads the first house band at the club, which helps pave the club's way to international fame and contributes to the beginning of rock n' roll on the Strip.
 The Teamsters union negotiates the first national labor contract in the United States.
 San Francisco Giants make champion outfielder Willie Mays the highest-paid player in baseball when they sign him to a new $105,000 per season contract.
 January 16
John Glenn, the first American to orbit the Earth, resigns from the space program.
 The musical Hello, Dolly! opens in New York City's St. James Theatre.
 January 17 
 John Glenn announces that he will seek the Democratic nomination for U.S. Senator from Ohio.
 Roald Dahl's Charlie and the Chocolate Factory is published by Alfred A. Knopf, Inc. in the United States.  
 January 18 – Plans to build the World Trade Center in New York City are announced.
 January 20 – Meet the Beatles!, the first Beatles album in the United States, is released.
 January 23
 Thirteen years after its proposal and nearly 2 years after its passage by the United States Senate, the 24th Amendment to the United States Constitution, prohibiting the use of poll taxes in national elections, is ratified.
 Arthur Miller's After the Fall opens Off-Broadway. A semi-autobiographical work, it arouses controversy over his portrayal of late ex-wife Marilyn Monroe.
 Designed by McKim, Mead & White, the Smithsonian Institution's Museum of History and Technology, predecessor of the National Museum of American History, opens to the public in Washington, D.C.
 January 27 – U.S. Senator Margaret Chase Smith, 66, announces her candidacy for the Republican presidential nomination.
 January 28 – A U.S. Air Force jet training plane that strays into East Germany is shot down by Soviet fighters near Erfurt; all 3 crew men are killed.
 January 29 – Ranger 6 is launched by NASA, on a mission to carry television cameras and crash-land on the Moon.

February
 February 1 – The Beatles vault to the #1 spot on the U.S. singles charts for the first time, with "I Want to Hold Your Hand", starting the British Invasion in America.
 February 3 – Protesting against alleged de facto school racial segregation, Black and Puerto Rican groups in New York City boycott public schools.
 February 4 
The Government of the United States authorizes the Twenty-fourth Amendment, outlawing the poll tax.
General Motors introduces the Oldsmobile Vista Cruiser and the Buick Sport Wagon.
 February 6 – Cuba cuts off the normal water supply to the United States Guantanamo Bay Naval Base, in reprisal for the U.S. seizure 4 days earlier of 4 Cuban fishing boats off the coast of Florida.
 February 7 
 An all-white jury in Jackson, Mississippi, trying Byron De La Beckwith for the murder of Medgar Evers in June 1963, reports that it cannot reach a verdict, resulting in a mistrial.
 The Beatles arrive from the UK at New York City's JFK International Airport, receiving a tumultuous reception from an estimated 4,000, marking the first occurrence of "Beatlemania" in the United States. The "Fab Four" stayed in suites 1260, 1263, 1264 and 1273 of the Plaza Hotel.
 February 9 – The Beatles appear on The Ed Sullivan Show, marking their first live performance on American television. Seen by an estimated 73 million viewers, the appearance becomes the catalyst for the mid-1960s "British Invasion" of American popular music.
 February 17 – Wesberry v. Sanders (376 US 1 1964): The Supreme Court of the United States rules that congressional districts have to be approximately equal in population.
 February 23 – Chrysler's second generation Hemi racing engine is showcased at the Daytona 500. The 426 hemi-powered Plymouth of Richard Petty (#43) wins. Hemi-powered Plymouths finish in first, second and third places.
 February 25 – Muhammad Ali vs. Sonny Liston: Cassius Clay beats Sonny Liston in Miami Beach, Florida, and is crowned heavyweight boxing champion of the world. This evening he celebrates in a hotel room with his three closest friends, activist Malcolm X, singer Sam Cooke and American football fullback Jim Brown, and soon afterwards changes his name.
 February 26 – U.S. politician and ex-astronaut John Glenn slips on a bathroom rug in his Columbus, Ohio apartment and hits his head on the bathtub, injuring his left inner ear, and prompting him (later that week) to withdraw from the race for the Democratic Party Senate nomination.

March
 March 4 – President of the Teamsters, Jimmy Hoffa is convicted by a federal jury of jury tampering in 1962 and receives a jail sentence.
 March 6
 Malcolm X, suspended from the Nation of Islam, says in New York City that he is forming a black nationalist party.
 Boxer Cassius Clay announces the change of his name to Muhammad Ali.
 March 8 – Malcolm X, suspended from the Nation of Islam, says in New York City that he is forming a black nationalist party.
 March 9 
New York Times Co. v Sullivan (376 US 254 1964): The United States Supreme Court rules that under the First Amendment, speech criticizing political figures cannot be censored.
 The first Ford Mustang is manufactured, by the Ford Motor Company, in Dearborn, Michigan.
 March 10 
Soviet military forces shoot down an unarmed reconnaissance bomber that had strayed into East Germany; the 3 U.S. flyers parachute to safety.
Henry Cabot Lodge Jr., Ambassador to South Vietnam, wins the New Hampshire Republican primary.
 March 12 – Malcolm X leaves the Nation of Islam.
 March 13 – It is falsely reported that 38 neighbors in Queens, New York City fail to respond to the cries of Kitty Genovese, 28, as she is being stabbed to death.
 March 14 – A Dallas, Texas jury finds Jack Ruby guilty of killing John F. Kennedy assassin Lee Harvey Oswald.
 March 26 – U.S. Defense Secretary Robert McNamara delivers an address that reiterates American determination to give South Vietnam increased military and economic aid, in its war against the Communist insurgency.
 March 27 – The Good Friday earthquake, the most powerful earthquake in U.S. history at a magnitude of 9.2, strikes South Central Alaska, killing 125 people and inflicting massive damage to the city of Anchorage, Alaska.
 March 30 – Merv Griffin's game show Jeopardy! debuts on NBC; Art Fleming is its first host.
 March 31 – The military, backed by the US, overthrows Brazilian President João Goulart in a coup, starting 21 years of dictatorship in Brazil.

April
 April 2 – Mrs. Malcolm Peabody, 72, mother of Massachusetts Governor Endicott Peabody, is released on $450 bond after spending 2 days in a St. Augustine, Florida jail, for participating in an anti-segregation demonstration there.
 April 3 – Malcolm X makes his "The Ballot or the Bullet" speech in Cleveland.
 April 4 – Three high school friends in Hoboken, N.J., open the first BLIMPIE on Washington Street.
 April 8 – Four of 5 railroad operating unions strike against the Illinois Central Railroad without warning, bringing to a head a 5-year dispute over railroad work rules.
 April 10 – Demolition of the Polo Grounds sports stadium commences in New York City.
 April 12 – In Detroit, Michigan, Malcolm X delivers a speech entitled "The Ballot or the Bullet."
 April 13 – The 36th Academy Awards ceremony, hosted by Jack Lemmon, is held at Santa Monica Civic Auditorium. Tony Richardson's Tom Jones is tied with Joseph L. Mankiewicz's Cleopatra for the most award wins with four, winning Best Picture and Best Director for Richardson. The film receives the most nominations with ten. Sidney Poitier also becomes the first black actor to win the award for Best Actor.
 April 14 – A Delta rocket's third-stage motor ignites prematurely in an assembly room at Cape Canaveral, killing 3.
 April 17
In the United States, the Ford Mustang is officially unveiled to the public.
Shea Stadium opens in Flushing, New York.
 April 20 – U.S. President Lyndon Johnson in New York, and Soviet Premier Nikita Khrushchev in Moscow, simultaneously announce plans to cut back production of materials for making nuclear weapons.
 April 22 – The 1964 New York World's Fair opens to celebrate the 300th anniversary of New Amsterdam being taken over by British forces under the Duke of York (later King James II) and being renamed New York in 1664. The fair runs until Oct. 18, 1964 and reopens April 21, 1965, finally closing October 17, 1965. (Not sanctioned, due to being within 10 years of the Seattle World's Fair in 1962, some countries decline, but many countries have pavilions with exotic crafts, art & food.)

May
 May 2 
Senator Barry Goldwater receives more than 75% of the votes in the Texas Republican Presidential primary.
Some 400–1,000 students march through Times Square, New York and another 700 in San Francisco, in the first major student demonstration against the Vietnam War. Smaller marches also occur in Boston, Seattle, and Madison, Wisconsin.
Henry Hezekiah Dee and Charles Eddie Moore, hitchhiking in Meadville, Mississippi, are kidnapped, beaten, and murdered by members of the Ku Klux Klan. Their badly decomposed bodies are found by chance in July during the search for missing activists Chaney, Goodman, and Schwerner.
 May 7 – Pacific Air Lines Flight 773 crashes near San Ramon, California, killing all 44 aboard; the FBI later reports that a cockpit recorder tape indicates that the pilot and co-pilot had been shot by a suicidal passenger.
May 12 – First draft-card burning: 12 young men in New York publicly burn their draft cards as an act of resistance to the Vietnam War.
 May 19 – The United States Department of State says that more than 40 hidden microphones have been found embedded in the walls of the U.S. Embassy in Moscow.
 May 22 – President Lyndon Johnson makes a speech at the University of Michigan, introducing the concept of the "Great Society".
 May 26 – Nelson Rockefeller defeats Barry Goldwater in the Oregon Republican primary, slowing but not stalling Goldwater's drive toward the presidential nomination.
 May 30 – Eddie Sachs and Dave MacDonald are killed in a fiery crash during the 1964 Indianapolis 500.

June
 June 2 – Senator Barry Goldwater wins the California Republican Presidential primary, making him the overwhelming favorite for the nomination.
 June 9 – In Federal Court in Kansas City, Kansas, Army deserter George John Gessner, 28, is convicted of passing United States secrets to the Soviet Union.
 June 10 
 The U.S. Senate votes cloture of the Civil Rights Bill after a 75-day filibuster.
 The Deacons for Defense and Justice (Black self-defense organization) is founded in Jonesboro, Louisiana.
 June 12 – Pennsylvania Governor William Scranton announces his candidacy for the Republican Presidential nomination, as part of a 'stop-Goldwater' movement.
 June 19 – U.S. Senator Edward Kennedy, 32, is seriously injured in a private plane crash at Southampton, Massachusetts; the pilot is killed.
 June 21
 Civil Rights Movement: Murders of Chaney, Goodman, and Schwerner – Three Congress of Racial Equality workers, Michael Schwerner, Andrew Goodman and James Chaney, are abducted and murdered near Philadelphia, Mississippi, by local members of the White Knights of the Ku Klux Klan with local law enforcement officials involved in the conspiracy.
 Jim Bunning pitches a perfect game for the Philadelphia Phillies.

July

 July 2 – President Lyndon Johnson signs the Civil Rights Act of 1964 into law, abolishing racial segregation in the United States.
 July 8 – U.S. military personnel announce that U.S. casualties in Vietnam have risen to 1,387, including 399 dead and 17 MIA.
 July 16 – At the Republican National Convention in San Francisco, U.S. presidential nominee Barry Goldwater declares that "extremism in the defense of liberty is no vice", and "moderation in the pursuit of justice is no virtue".
 July 18
 Six days of race riots begin in Harlem, New York, United States, apparently prompted by the shooting of a teenager.
 "False Hare" is the final Warner Bros. cartoon with "target" titles.
 July 23 – The first Arby's opens in Boardman, Ohio.
 July 24 – There is a minor criticality accident at a United Nuclear Corporation Fuels recovery plant in Wood River Junction, Richmond, Rhode Island. 37-year-old Robert Peabody dies two days after the incident.
 July 27 – Vietnam War: The U.S. sends 5,000 more military advisers to South Vietnam, bringing the total number of United States forces in Vietnam to 21,000.

August
 August 1 – The final Looney Tune, Señorella and the Glass Huarache, is released before the Warner Bros. cartoon division is shut down by Jack Warner.
Air support from the carrier  sinks one gunboat, while the other two leave the battle.
 August 4 – Murders of Chaney, Goodman, and Schwerner – The bodies of Michael Schwerner, Andrew Goodman and James Chaney, murdered in June, are found.
 August 5 – Vietnam War: Operation Pierce Arrow – Aircraft from carriers  and  bomb North Vietnam in retaliation for strikes against U.S. destroyers in the Gulf of Tonkin.
 August 7 – Vietnam War: The United States Congress passes the Gulf of Tonkin Resolution, giving U.S. President Lyndon B. Johnson broad war powers to deal with North Vietnamese attacks on U.S. forces.
 August 16 – Vietnam War: In a coup, General Nguyễn Khánh replaces Dương Văn Minh as South Vietnam's chief of state and establishes a new constitution, drafted partly by the U.S. Embassy.
 August 17 – Margaret Harshaw, Metropolitan Opera Soprano, sings the role of Turandot in Puccini's opera Turandot at the New York World's Fair. August 21, 1964
 August 22 – Fannie Lou Hamer, civil rights activist and Vice Chair of the Mississippi Freedom Democratic Party, addresses the Credentials Committee of the Democratic National Convention, challenging the all-white Mississippi delegation.
 August 24–27 – The Democratic National Convention in Atlantic City nominates incumbent President Lyndon B. Johnson for a full term, and U.S. Senator Hubert Humphrey of Minnesota as his running mate.
 August 27 – Walt Disney's Mary Poppins has its world premiere in Los Angeles. It will go on to become Disney's biggest moneymaker, and winner of 5 Academy Awards, including a Best Actress award for Julie Andrews, who accepted the part after she was passed over by Jack L. Warner for the leading role of Eliza Doolittle in the film version of My Fair Lady. Mary Poppins is the first Disney film to be nominated for Best Picture.
 August 28 – Bob Dylan turns the Beatles on to cannabis for the first time.
 August 28–30 – Philadelphia 1964 race riot: Tensions between African American residents and police lead to 341 injuries and 774 arrests.

September
 September 4 – The last execution in the U.S. for a crime other than murder occurs in Alabama, as James Coburn is put to death for robbery.
 September 7 – President Lyndon Johnson's re-election campaign airs the controversial and influential "Daisy" ad.
 September 12 – Canyonlands National Park is established.
 September 16 – Shindig! premieres on ABC television, featuring the top musical acts of the decade.
 September 17 – Bewitched, starring Elizabeth Montgomery, premieres on ABC.
 September 21 – The North American XB-70 Valkyrie makes its first flight at Palmdale, California.
 September 26 – The sitcom Gilligan's Island, starring Bob Denver as Gilligan premieres on CBS.
 September 27 – The Warren Commission Report, the first official investigation of the assassination of John F. Kennedy, is published.

October
 October 1 – Three thousand student activists at University of California, Berkeley surround and block a police car from taking a CORE volunteer arrested for not showing his ID, when he violated a ban on outdoor activist card tables. This protest eventually evolves into the Berkeley Free Speech Movement.
 October 10–24 – The United States participates in the 1964 Summer Olympics in Tokyo, Japan and ranks first for the 10th time, bringing home 36 gold, 26 silver and 28 bronze medals for a total of 90 medals.
 October 14 – Martin Luther King Jr., a leader in the American civil rights movement, becomes the youngest recipient of the Nobel Peace Prize, which was awarded to him for leading non-violent resistance to end racial prejudice in the United States.
 October 15
The St. Louis Cardinals defeat the visiting New York Yankees 7–5 to win the World Series in 7 games (4–3), ending a long run of 29 World Series appearances in 44 seasons for the Bronx Bombers (also known as the Yankee Dynasty).
 October 18 – The New York World's Fair closes for the year (it reopens April 21, 1965).
 October 20 – Former President Herbert Hoover dies in New York City.
 October 21 – The film version of the hit Lerner and Loewe Broadway stage musical My Fair Lady premieres in New York City. The movie stars Belgian-born Audrey Hepburn in the role of Eliza Doolittle (with her singing voice dubbed by Marni Nixon) and English actor Rex Harrison repeating his stage performance as Professor Henry Higgins, and which will win him his only Academy Award for Best Actor. The film will win seven other Oscars, including Best Picture, but Hepburn will not be nominated. Critics interpret this as a rebuke to studio executive Jack L. Warner for choosing Ms. Hepburn over English singer Julie Andrews. 
 October 22 – A 5.3 kiloton nuclear device is detonated at the Tatum Salt Dome,  from Hattiesburg, Mississippi, as part of the Vela Uniform program. This test is the Salmon phase of the Atomic Energy Commission's Project Dribble.
 October 27 – In the Democratic Republic of the Congo, rebel leader Christopher Gbenye takes 60 Americans and 800 Belgians hostage.
 October 29 – A collection of irreplaceable gemstones, including the  Star of India, is stolen from the American Museum of Natural History in New York City.
 October 31 – Campaigning at Madison Square Garden in New York City, President Lyndon Johnson pledges the creation of the Great Society.
 October – Dr. Robert Moog demonstrates his prototype synthesizers.

November

 November 1 – Mortar fire from North Vietnamese forces rains on the USAF base at Biên Hòa, South Vietnam, killing 4 U.S. servicemen, wounding 72, and destroying 5 B-57 jet bombers and other planes.
 November 3 – U.S. presidential election, 1964: Incumbent U.S. President Lyndon B. Johnson defeats Republican challenger Barry Goldwater with over 60 percent of the popular vote.
 November 5 – Mariner program: Mariner 3, a U.S. space probe intended for Mars, is launched from Cape Kennedy but fails.
 November 13 – Bob Pettit (St. Louis Hawks) becomes the first NBA player to score 20,000 points.
 November 19 – The United States Department of Defense announces the closing of 95 military bases and facilities, including the Brooklyn Navy Yard, the Brooklyn Army Terminal, and Fort Jay, New York.
 November 28 
Mariner program: NASA launches the Mariner 4 space probe from Cape Kennedy toward Mars to take television pictures of that planet in July 1965.
Vietnam War: United States National Security Council members, including Robert McNamara, Dean Rusk, and Maxwell Taylor, agree to recommend a plan for a 2-stage escalation of bombing in North Vietnam, to President Lyndon B. Johnson.

December
 December 1 – Vietnam War: U.S. President Lyndon B. Johnson and his top-ranking advisers meet to discuss plans to bomb North Vietnam (after some debate, they agree on a 2-phase bombing plan).
 December 3 – Berkeley Free Speech Movement: Police arrest about 800 students at the University of California, Berkeley, following their takeover of and massive sit-in at the Sproul Hall administration building.  The sit-in most directly protested the U.C. Regents' decision to punish student activists for what many thought had been justified civil disobedience earlier in the conflict.
 December 6 – The 1-hour stop-motion animated special Rudolph the Red-Nosed Reindeer, based on the popular Christmas song, is broadcast for the first time, on NBC. It becomes a Christmas tradition.
 December 10 – Martin Luther King Jr. is awarded the Nobel Peace Prize in Oslo, Norway.
 December 11
 Sam Cooke, African American singer-songwriter, is shot and killed at a motel in Los Angeles, California.
 Che Guevara addresses the United Nations General Assembly; a bazooka attack is launched at the Headquarters of the United Nations in New York City.
 December 14 – Heart of Atlanta Motel v. United States (379 US 241 1964): The U.S. Supreme Court rules that, in accordance with the Civil Rights Act of 1964, establishments providing public accommodations must refrain from racial discrimination.
 December 15 – The Washington Post publishes an article about James Hampton, who had built a glittering religious throne out of recycled materials.
 December 18 
In the wake of deadly riots in January over control of the Panama Canal, the U.S. offers to negotiate a new canal treaty.
The deadly Christmas flood of 1964 begins, affecting the United States' Pacific Northwest and some of Northern California. It continues until January 7 and results in 19 deaths, damage to 10 towns, serious damage to 20 major highway and county bridges, and the loss of 4,000 head of livestock.
 December 27 – The Cleveland Browns defeat the Baltimore Colts in the NFL Championship Game.

Undated
 Dr. Farrington Daniels' book Direct Use of the Sun's Energy is published by Yale University Press.
 Pasadena Maple Leafs, an amateur youth ice hockey club in California is founded.

Ongoing
 Cold War (1947–1991)
 Space Race (1957–1975)
 Vietnam War, U.S. involvement (1964–1973)

Births

January
 January 1
 Juliana Donald, actress
 Dedee Pfeiffer, film and television actress
 January 3 – Jon Gibson, Christian musician
 January 4 – Dot-Marie Jones, shot putter (competed as Dot Jones) and actress
 January 6 
 Colin Cowherd, talk show host
 Charles Haley, American football player and coach
 Jacqueline Moore, wrestler
 Anthony Scaramucci, financier, entrepreneur, and political figure
 January 7 – Nicolas Cage, actor, producer and director
 January 10 – Karen and Sarah Josephson, synchronized swimmers
 January 12 – Jimmy John Liautaud, entrepreneur and founder of Jimmy John's
 January 14 – Shepard Smith, broadcast journalist
 January 17 – Michelle Obama, lawyer, first African-American First Lady of the United States as wife of the 44th President of the United States, Barack Obama
 January 20 – Fareed Zakaria, journalist 
 January 25 – Billy Andrade, golfer
 January 29 – Andre Reed, American football player and sportscaster

February
 February 10 – Glenn Beck, television and radio host, conservative political commentator, author, television network producer, filmmaker and entrepreneur
 February 11
 Sarah Palin, politician, Governor of Alaska from 2006 to 2009, and 2008 Republican vice-presidential candidate
 Ken Shamrock, mixed martial arts fighter
 February 15
 Mark Price, basketball player
 Chris Farley, actor and comedian (d. 1997)
 February 17 
 Buster Olney, journalist  
 Angelica Page, actress, director, producer and screenwriter
 February 18 – Matt Dillon, actor and film director
 February 19
 Jennifer Doudna, biochemist
 Jonathan Lethem, fiction writer
 Richard A. Scott, illustrator
 February 20
 Willie Garson, character actor (died 2021)
 French Stewart, screen actor
 February 22 – Ed Boon, video game designer
 February 24 – Chris Austin, country music singer (died 1991)

March
 March 2 
 Mike Von Erich, professional wrestler (died 1987)
 Tim Layana, baseball pitcher player (died 1999)
 March 3 – Rod Jones, American football tight end (died 2018)
 March 4
 Paul Bostaph, thrash metal drummer
 Tom Lampkin, baseball player
 March 6
 Skip Ewing, country singer
 Yvette Wilson, African American screen actress and comedian (died 2012)
 March 7
 Bret Easton Ellis, fiction writer
 Wanda Sykes, African American comedian and actress
 March 9 – Steve Wilkos, retired police officer and talk show host
 March 11 – Vinnie Paul, drummer (Pantera, Damageplan, Hellyeah) (died 2018) 
 March 18 – Bonnie Blair, speed skater
 March 23 – Hope Davis, actress
 March 24 – Steve Souza, singer (Exodus) 
 March 25
 LisaGay Hamilton, actress
 Mike Henry, actor and voice actor
 Vince Offer, writer, director, comedian and pitchman
 March 26
 Todd Barry, stand-up comedian, actor and voice actor
 Cynthia MacGregor, tennis player (died 1996)
 Ed Wasser, actor
 March 29
 Michael A. Jackson, Maryland State Senator
 Catherine Cortez Masto, U.S. Senator from Nevada
 Ming Tsai, Chinese-American chef
 March 30 – Ian Ziering, actor and voice actor

April
 April 4 
 David Cross, actor, writer and stand-up comedian
 Robbie Rist, actor, voice actor, singer and musician
 April 6 
 Tim Walz, politician
 David Woodard, businessman
 April 8 
Biz Markie, rapper and DJ (died 2021)  
Lisa Guerrero, Hispanic American actress, model and sportscaster/reporter
 April 9 
 Doug Ducey, 23rd Governor of Arizona
 Lisa Guerrero, Hispanic actress, model and sportscaster/reporter
 April 13 – Page Hannah, television and film actress 
 April 14
 Brian Adams, professional wrestler (died 2007) 
 Jeff Andretti, race car driver 
 Jeff Andretti, race car driver
 Greg Battle, American-Canadian football player
 Stuart Duncan, bluegrass musician
 Jim Grabb, tennis player
 April 17
 Lela Rochon, actress 
 Maynard James Keenan, singer, actor, and winemaker, frontman of Tool
 April 19 – Harris Barton, American football player  
 April 20 
John Carney, American football player
Crispin Glover, actor, author, director, screenwriter, publisher and recording artist
 Sean A. Moore, writer (died 1998)  
 April 21 – Michael Louden, actor (died 2004)  
 April 24
 Cedric the Entertainer, actor and comedian 
 Augusta Read Thomas, composer
 April 25
 Hank Azaria, voice actor
 Wes Freed, outsider artist (died 2022) 
 April 28
 L'Wren Scott, fashion designer (suicide 2014)
 David Hampton, con artist and robber (died 2003)

May 
 May 1 – Will Kimbrough, singer-songwriter, guitarist and producer
 May 4 – Gary Holt, guitarist (Exodus  and Slayer)
 May 6 – Dana Hill, voice actress (died 1996)
 May 7 
 Ronnie Harmon, American football player 
 Leslie O'Neal, American football player  
 May 8 – Bobby Labonte, race car driver
 May 11
 Tim Blake Nelson, actor, writer, and director
 Katie Wagner, television personality 
 May 12 – Geechy Guy, comedian 
 May 13
 Ronnie Coleman, retired professional IFBB bodybuilder, 8x Mr Olympia 
 Stephen Colbert, comedian, political commentator, and television personality; host of The Late Show with Stephen Colbert
 May 14 – Suzy Kolber, sportscaster
 May 15 – Michael Gerson, journalist and speechwriter (died 2022)
 May 16 – John Salley, basketball player and talk show host
 May 17 – Nancy Benoit, professional wrestling valet and model (died 2007)
 May 22 – Marcus Dupree, American football player  
 May 27 – Adam Carolla, comedic radio and television personality 
 May 30
 Tom Morello, musician and political activist (Rage Against the Machine, Audioslave, Prophets of Rage)
 Wynonna Judd, country singer

June
 June 3 
 Daniel Lieberman, paleoanthropologist 
 Kerry King, guitarist (Slayer) 
 June 7
 Judie Aronson, actress
 Judith Neelley, serial killer
 June 9 – Wayman Tisdale, NBA basketball star and smooth jazz musician (died 2009)
 June 10 – Kate Flannery, actress
 June 12 – Paula Marshall, actress
 June 14 – E. Elias Merhige, director
 June 15 – Courteney Cox, actress, producer, and director
 June 19
 Bill Barretta, actor, puppeteer, producer and director
 Laura Ingraham, radio host and political commentator
 June 20 – Michael Landon Jr., actor, director, writer, and producer 
 June 21
 Doug Savant, actor
 Josh Pais, actor
 June 22
 Cadillac Anderson, basketball player
 Amy Brenneman, actress
 Dan Brown, author
 June 23 – Clete Blakeman, American football referee  
 June 24 – Kari Kennell, actress 
 June 27 – Michael Reilly Burke, actor 
 June 30 – Mark Waters, screenwriter, director and film producer

July
 July 1
 Paul Coyne, TV producer and editor
 M Otis Beard, writer, singer/songwriter 
 July 3 – Peyton Reed, television and film director 
 July 4 – Mark Slaughter, singer and musician
 July 5 
 Jimmy Demers, singer-songwriter
 Ronald D. Moore, screenwriter and television producer  
 July 6 – John Ottman, film composer and editor
 July 7 – Tracy Reiner, actress
 July 9 – Courtney Love, actress, artist, author, musician, singer-songwriter and Kurt Cobain's wife 
 July 10 – Urban Meyer, college football player and coach
 July 13 – Charlie Hides, drag queen and comedian
 July 15 – John Brzenk, armwrestler
 July 17 
 Heather Langenkamp, actress
 Craig Morgan, country music singer-songwriter
 July 19
 Peter Dobson, actor
 Teresa Edwards, basketball player
 July 20
 Chris Cornell, singer (Soundgarden, Audioslave, Temple of the Dog) (d. 2017)
 Dean Winters, actor
 July 21 – Susan Swift, actress 
 July 22 – David Spade, comedian, actor and television personality  
 July 24 – Barry Bonds, baseball player
 July 26 – Sandra Bullock, actress
 July 28 – Lori Loughlin, actress

August
 August 3 – Joan Higginbotham, African-American astronaut and engineer  
 August 5 – Adam Yauch, rapper (Beastie Boys) (died 2012)
 August 7 – Tom McGrath, voice actor, animator, screenwriter, and film director  
 August 11 – Lawrence Monoson, actor  
 August 16
 Jimmy Arias, tennis player
 William Salyers, actor
 August 20 – Markus Flanagan, actor
 August 22
 Andrew Wilson, film actor and director
 Tom Gibis, voice actor
 August 23 – Wendy Pepper, fashion designer (died 2017)
 August 24 – Mark Cerny, video game programmer
 August 25 – Blair Underwood, actor and director  
 August 26 – Sabine Hyland, anthropologist
 August 28 – Felicia Taylor, anchor-correspondent

September
 September 1 
 Holly Golightly, author and illustrator 
 Charlie Robison, singer-songwriter and guitarist 
 David West, baseball player (died 2022)
 September 2 – Jimmy Banks, soccer defender (died 2019)  
 September 3
 Adam Curry, American-Dutch businessman and television host, co-founded Mevio
 Spike Feresten, screenwriter and producer 
 Holt McCallany, actor
 September 4 – Anthony Weiner, U.S. Congressman
 September 6
 Todd Palin, husband of politician Sarah Palin
 Rosie Perez, screen actress
 John E. Sununu, U.S. Senator from New Hampshire from 2003 to 2009
 September 8
 Michael Johns, health care executive and Presidential speechwriter
 Mitchell Whitfield, actor and voice actor
 Raven, professional wrestler
 September 10 – Donna De Lory, singer and dancer
 September 11 – Ellis Burks, baseball player and manager
 September 12 – Greg Gutfeld, television personality
 September 14 
 Faith Ford, actress
 Stephen Dunham, actor (died 2012)
 September 18 – Holly Robinson Peete, actress and singer
 September 19
 Kim Richards, actress
 Trisha Yearwood, country singer
 September 24 – Jeff Krosnoff, race car driver (died 1996) 
 September 26 – Scott Brower, ice hockey goaltender (died 1998)
 September 28 – Janeane Garofalo, actress and comedian

October
 October 1 – Christopher Titus, comedian and actor
 October 5 – Dave Dederer, guitarist and singer
 October 7 – Dan Savage, author and journalist 
 October 8 – CeCe Winans, African-American Christian musician
 October 13
 Matt Walsh, actor, comedian, director, and writer
 Gordy Hoffman, screenwriter and director
 Doug Emhoff, Second Gentleman of the United States
 October 14 
 Joe Girardi, baseball player-manager
 Jim Rome, sports T.V. and radio host
 October 19 – Ty Pennington, carpenter, model and television personality  
 October 20 – Kamala Harris, 49th (and first female) Vice President of the United States since 2021
 October 22 – TobyMac, Christian musician
 October 23 – Robert Trujillo, Metallica bassist
 October 25 
 Dwight Garner, American football player (died 2022)
 Kevin Michael Richardson, African-American actor and voice actor  
 October 26 – Danny Mastrogiorgio, actor 
 October 30
 Tabitha St. Germain, American-born Canadian actress 
 Mark Steven Johnson, screenwriter, film director, and producer

November
 November 1
 Sophie B. Hawkins, singer-songwriter
 Daran Norris, actor and voice actor 
 November 4 – Douglas Wilson, television personality and interior designer 
 November 7 – Dana Plato, actress (died 1999)  
 November 10 – Kenny Rogers, baseball player 
 November 11
 Calista Flockhart, actress
 Philip McKeon, actor (died 2019)
 November 12
Vic Chesnutt, folk rock singer-songwriter and guitarist (brute. and The Undertow Orchestra) (died 2009)
David Ellefson, rock bassist and songwriter (Megadeth, Avian and F5)
 Michael Kremer, development economist, recipient of the Nobel Memorial Prize in Economic Sciences
 November 14 
Rockie Lynne, singer-songwriter and guitarist
Joseph Simmons, rapper
 Patrick Warburton, actor and voice artist  
 November 17 
 Mitch Williams, baseball player 
 Susan Rice, diplomat and National Security Advisor from 2013 to 2017
 November 18 – Seth Joyner, African-American football player
 November 19
 Fred Diamond, mathematician
 Shawn Holman, baseball pitcher
 Eric Musselman, college basketball coach (Sacramento Kings)
 November 21 – Shane Douglas, wrestler
 November 23 – Boyd Kestner, actor
 November 24
 Garret Dillahunt, actor 
 Chris Reccardi, animator (died 2019)
 November 25 – Mark Lanegan, singer-songwriter (died 2022) 
 November 27
 Robin Givens, African-American actress 
 Adam Shankman, film director, producer, dancer, author, actor, and choreographer
 November 28 
 Giorgi Bagaturov, Georgian-Armenian chess grandmaster
 Michael Bennet, U.S. Senator from Colorado from 2009
 Paul Kostacopoulos, college baseball coach
 Michelle McKormick, talk radio personality
 Roy Tarpley, basketball player
 Craig Wilson, baseball third baseman

December
 December 3
 Darryl Hamilton, baseball player (died 2015) 
 Scott Huckabay, guitarist 
 December 4
 Chelsea Noble, actress
 Jonathan Goldstein, actor, director and musician
 December 7
 Patrick Fabian, actor
 Curtis Hughes, wrestler
 Peter Laviolette, ice hockey coach
 December 10 – Bobby Flay, chef and author
 December 12 
 Haywood Jeffires, American football player and coach
 Sabu, professional wrestler
 December 13 – Tony Roper, stock car racing driver (d. 2000)
 December 14 – Karey Kirkpatrick, screenwriter and director 
 December 15 – Jerry Ball, American football player
 December 16 – Billy Ripken, baseball player
 December 17 – Steve Marmel, television writer and producer 
 December 18
 Stone Cold Steve Austin, professional wrestler 
 Cledus T. Judd, Country comedy singer
 December 21 – Daniel Suarez, novelist
 December 22 – Mike Jackson, former MLB pitcher
 December 27 – Theresa Randle, actress
 December 29 – Michael Cudlitz, actor
 December 30 – George Newbern, actor
 December 31 – Michael McDonald, actor and comedian

Deaths
 January 27
 Norman Z. McLeod, film director (born 1898)
 Waite Phillips, oil man, banker and real estate investor (born 1883)
 February 16 – James M. Canty, educator, school administrator, and businessperson (born 1865)
 February 29 – Frank Albertson, actor (born 11909)
 March 22 – Addison Richards, actor (born 1887)
 April 9 – Jerry Gaetz, politician (born 1914)
 April 20 – Eddie Dyer, baseball player and manager (born 1899)
 May 7 – Lee Fenner, American footballer (born 1897)
 June 17
 Clarence G. Badger, film director (born 1880)
 Joel S. Goldsmith, spiritual healer and founder of "The Infinite Way" movement (born 1892)
 June 21
 James Chaney, civil rights activist (born 1943; murdered by Ku Klux Klan)
 Andrew Goodman, civil rights activist (born 1943; murdered by Ku Klux Klan)
 Michael Schwerner, civil rights activist (born 1939; murdered by Ku Klux Klan)
 July 26 – William A. Seiter, film director (born 1890)
 July 29 – Vean Gregg, baseball player (born 1885)
 July 31 – Jim Reeves, country singer-songwriter (born 1923)
 August 3 – Flannery O'Connor, novelist and short story writer (born 1925)
 September 6 – Jane Hadley Barkley, Second Lady of the United States as wife of Alben W. Barkley (born 1911)
 September 28 – Harpo Marx, comedian (born 1888)
 October 10 – Eddie Cantor, entertainer (born 1892)
 October 20 – Herbert Hoover, 31st President of the United States from 1929 to 1933 (born 1874)
 December 3 – Charles P. Snyder, admiral (born 1879)  
 December 11
 Sam Cooke, singer-songwriter (born 1931)
 Percy Kilbride, actor (born 1888)
 Alma Mahler, widow and muse of Gustav Mahler, Walter Gropius and Franz Werfel (born 1879 in Vienna)
 December 28 – Cliff Sterrett, cartoonist (born 1883) 
 December 31 – Gertrude Michael, actress (born 1911)

See also
 1964 (film)
 List of American films of 1964
 Timeline of United States history (1950–1969)

References

External links
 
Booknotes interview with Jon Margolis on The Last Innocent Year: America in 1964, June 27, 1999.
 

 
1960s in the United States
United States
United States
Years of the 20th century in the United States